The Engraving Copyright Act 1734 or Engravers' Copyright Act (8 Geo.2 c.13) was an Act of the Parliament of Great Britain first read on 4 March 1734/35 and eventually passed on 25 June 1735 to give protections to producers of engravings. It is also called Hogarth's Act after William Hogarth, who prompted the law together with some fellow engravers. Historian Mark Rose notes, "The Act protected only those engravings that involved original designs and thus, implicitly, made a distinction between artists and mere craftsmen. Soon, however, Parliament was persuaded to extend protection to all engravings."

This Act was one of the Copyright Acts 1734 to 1888.

This Act was repealed by sections 36 and 37(2) of, and schedule 2 to, the Copyright Act 1911 (c.46) which replaced and consolidated existing copyright legislation.

References

Further reading
Berg, Maxine. "From Imitation to Invention: Creating Commodities in Eighteenth-Century Britain." The Economic History Review 55, no. 1 (2002): 1-30.
Deazley, Ronan. Rethinking Copyright: History, Theory, Language. Cheltenham, UK: Edward Elgar. 2006.
Deazley, Ronan, Martin Kretschmer, and Lionel Bently. Privilege and Property: Essays on the History of Copyright. Cambridge, UK: Open Book Publishers, 2010.
Dickinson, H.T. The Politics of the People in Eighteenth-Century Britain. New York: ST. Martin’s Press, Inc., 1995.
Donald, Diana. The Age of Caricature: Satirical Prints in the Reign of George III. New Haven: Yale University Press, 1996.
Erwin, Timothy. "Hogarth and the Aesthetics of Nationalism." Huntington Library Quarterly 64,no. 3/4 (2001): 383-410.
Hogarth, William, William Makepeace Thackeray, and Charles Lamb. The Works of William Hogarth Reproduced by the Heliotype Process from the Original Engravings. Boston: Osgood, 1876.
Hoppit, Julian. A Land of Liberty?: England 1689-1727. Oxford [England]: Clarendon Press. 2000.
Hunter, David. "Copyright Protection for Engravings and Maps in Eighteenth-Century Britain." The Library 6, no. 2 (1987): 128-147.
Jarrett, Derek. England in the Age of Hogarth. New York: The Viking Press, 1974.
Colley, Linda. Britons: Forging the Nation 1707-1837. 2nd ed. N.p.: Yale University Press,2005.
Lindsay, Jack. Hogarth: His Art and His World. London: Granada Publishing Limited, 1977.
Loewenstein, Joseph. The Author's Due: Printing and the Prehistory of Copyright. Chicago: University of Chicago Press. 2002.
Miller, Peter N. Defining the Common Good: Empire, Religion and Philosophy in Eighteenth-Century Britain. N.p.: Cambridge University Press, 1994.
Patterson, Lyman R. Copyright in Historical Perspective. Nashville: Vanderbilt University Press, 1968.
Rose, Mark. Authors and Owners: The Invention of Copyright. Cambridge: Harvard University Press, 1993. 
Sherman, Brad, and Lionel Bently. The Making of Modern Intellectual Property Law: The British Experience, 1760-1911. Cambridge [England]: Cambridge University Press.1999.
Simon, Robin. Hogarth, France and British Art: The Rise of the Arts in 18th-Century Britain. N.p.: Hogarth Arts, 2007.
Solkin, David H. Painting for Money: The Visual Arts and the Public Sphere in Eighteenth-Century England. New Haven: Published for the Paul Mellon Centre for Studies in British Art by Yale University Press. 1993.
Temple, Kathryn. Scandal Nation: Law and Authorship in Britain, 1750-1832. Ithaca, NY: Cornell University Press, 2003.
Thompson, E. P. The Making of the English Working Class. New York: Pantheon Books. 1964.
 The text of the act

United Kingdom copyright law
Great Britain Acts of Parliament 1734
Repealed Great Britain Acts of Parliament
Copyright legislation
Engraving